A Bachelor in Clinical Psychology is a type of postgraduate academic bachelor's degree awarded by universities in many countries. This degree is typically studied for in Clinical Psychology.

Curriculum Structure
A Bachelor of Arts or Science in Clinical Psychology is a four-year bachelor's degree, or depending on the program, clinical psychology may be offered as a concentration to a traditional bachelor's degree in psychology.

Topics of study may include:
 Adversarial system
 addiction
 anxiety
 Behavioral therapy
 clinical depression
 Cognitive behavioral therapy
 eating disorders
 Family therapy
 Humanistic psychology
 Integrative psychotherapy
 Occupational therapy
 phobia
 psychosis
 Psychodynamic psychotherapy
 Psychological evaluation
 psychological trauma
 Psychotherapy
 relationship counseling
 sexual dysfunction
 sleep disorders
 Training and licensing of clinical psychologists

See also 
 Anti-psychiatry
 Applied Psychology
 Clinical Associate (Psychology)
 Clinical trial
 List of Clinical Psychologists
 List of credentials in psychology
 List of psychology topics
 List of psychotherapies
 List of tagged degrees
 Outline of psychology
 Psychiatric and mental health nursing
 Psychoneuroimmunology

References

Arts in Clinical Psychology
Clinical psychology
Psychology education